Chalapathi Rao (8 May 1944 – 24 December 2022) was an Indian actor and producer known for comedy and villainous roles in Telugu cinema. He acted in different roles in more than 600 films.

Personal life and death
Rao hailed from Baliparru, Krishna district, Andhra Pradesh. His son Ravi Babu is an actor, director and producer in Tollywood.

Rao died from a heart attack on 24 December 2022, at the age of 78.

Partial filmography

As actor

Gudachari 116 (1966)
Sakshi (1967)
Buddhimantudu (1969)
Takkari Donga Chakkani Chukka (1969)
Kathanayakudu (1969)
Mayani Mamata (1970)
Pettandarulu (1970)
Sampoorna Ramayanam (1971)
Adrusta Jathakudu (1971)
Kalam Marindi (1972)
Desoddharakulu (1973)
Andalaramudu (1973)
Doctor Babu (1973)
Tatamma Kala (1974)
Yamagola (1975)
Annadammula Anubandham (1975)
Manushulanta Okkate (1976)
Yamagola (1977)
Daana Veera Soora Karna (1977)
Yuga Purushudu (1978)
Driver Ramudu (1979)
Vetagadu (1979)
Sri Tirupati Venkateswara Kalyanam (1979)
Akbar Salim Anarkali (1979)
Yuvatharam Kadilindi (1980)
Kottapeta Rowdy (1980)
Mama Allulla Saval (1980) as Public Prosecutor
Adrushtavanthudu (1980)
Bhale Krishnudu (1980)
Sarada Ramudu (1980)
Buchchi Babu (1980)
Rowdy Ramudu Konte Krishnudu (1980)
Kondaveeti Simham(1981)
Taxi Driver (1981)
Guru Shishyulu (1981)
Prema Kanuka (1981)
Madhura Swapnam (1982)
Justice Chowdary (1982)
Jeevan Dhaara (1982)
Trishulam (1982)
Kaliyuga Ramudu (1982)
Bobbili Puli (1982)
Pagabattina Simham (1982)
Sri Ranga Neethulu (1983)
Dharma Poratam (1983) as Keshavji
Mundadugu (1983) as Nagendra
Shakthi (1983)
Khaidi (1983)
Prajarajyam (1983)
Bobbili Brahmanna (1984)
Intiguttu (1984)
Anubandham (1984)
Srimadvirat Veerabrahmendra Swami Charitra (1984)
Chattamtho Poratam (1985)
Aggiraju (1985)
Shri Datta Darshanam (1985)
Adavi Donga (1985)
Pattabhishekam (1985)
Kirathakudu (1986)
Jayam Manade (1986) as Sobhanadri
Kaliyuga Pandavulu (1986)
Apoorva Sahodarudu (1986)
Ugra Narasimham (1986)
Anasuyamma Gari Alludu (1986)
Allari Krishnaiah (1986)
Agni Putrudu (1987)
Bharatamlo Arjunudu (1987)
Bhargava Ramudu (1987)
Sahasa Samrat (1987)
Janaki Ramudu (1988)
Inspector Pratap (1988)
Donga Ramudu (1988)
Tiragabadda Telugubidda (1988)
Ramudu Bheemudu (1988)
Prema (1989)
Vijay (1989)
Simha Swapnam (1989)
Ashoka Chakravarthy (1989)
Bhale Donga (1989)
Dorikithe Dongalu (1989) as Koteshwara Rao
Palnati Rudraiah (1989) as Chalapathi
Justice Rudrama Devi (1990)
Aggiramudu (1990)
Kondaveeti Donga (1990)
Aditya 369 (1991)
Mother India (1992)
Peddarikam (1992)
Gharana Mogudu (1992)
Kunthiputhrudu (1993)
Parugo Parugu (1993)
Chinna Alludu (1993)
Allari Alludu (1993)
Jailor Gaari Abbayi (1994)
Aame (1994)
Super Police (1994)
Gandeevam (1994)
Bobbili Simham (1994)
Ghatotkachudu (1995)
Alluda Majaka (1995)
Pokiri Raja (1995)
Sisindri (1995)
Pedarayudu (1995)
Sankalpam (1995)
Vajram (1995)
Sampradhayam (1996)
Ninne Pelladata (1996)
Vamsanikokkadu (1996)
Gulabi (1996)
Ramudochadu (1996)
Jabilamma Pelli (1996)
Mrugam (1996)
Maa Nannaki Pelli (1997)
Veedevadandi Babu (1997)
Chilakkottudu (1997)
Anaganaga Oka Roju (1997)
Abbai Gari Pelli (1997)
Muddula Mogudu (1997)
Oka Chinna Maata (1997)
Snehithudu (1998)
Yuvaratna Raana (1998)
Sri Sitaramula Kalyanam Chutamu Rarandi (1998)
Panduga (1998)
Yamajathakudu (1999)
Sooryavansham (Hindi Film) (1999) as Superintendent of Police
Sri Ramulayya (1999)
Nee Kosam (1999)
Real Story (2000)
Chala Bagundi (2000)
Ninne Premistha (2000)
Nuvve Kavali (2000)
Vamshoddharakudu (2000)
Ammo! Okato Tareekhu (2000)
Sampangi (2001)
Naalo Unna Prema (2001)
Mrugaraju (2001)
Akasa Veedhilo (2001)
Simharasi (2001)
Snehamante Idera (2001)
Cheppalani Vundhi (2001)
Apparaoki Oka Nela Thappindi (2001)
Aadi (2002)
Allari (2002)
Tappu Chesi Pappu Koodu (2002) 
Hai (2002) 
Holi (2002)
Thotti Gang (2002)
 Chennakesava Reddy (2002)
Dil (2003) 	
Simhadri (2003)
Dham (2003)
Nenu.. Sita Maa Laxmi (2003)
Ammayilu Abbayilu (2003)
 Janaki Weds Sriram (2003)
Aruguru Pativratalu (2004) 
Malliswari (2004) 
Nenu (2004)
Gowri (2004)
Shankar Dada M.B.B.S. (2004)
Aaptudu (2004)
Aa Naluguru (2004)
Bhadradri Ramudu (2004) 
Pourusham (2005)
Dhairyam (2005)
Bunny (2005)
Good Boy (2005)
Allari Pidugu (2005)
Jagapati (2005)
Nuvvante Naakishtam (2005)
Kithakithalu (2006)
Mudhu (2006)
Asadhyudu (2006)
Bommarillu (2006)
Party (2006)
Andala Ramudu (2006)
Godava (2007)
Madhumasam (2007) 
Athili Sattibabu LKG (2007) 
Munna (2007)
Operation Duryodhana (2007) 
Lakshyam (2007)
Yamagola Malli Modalayindi (2007)
Bhajantrilu (2007) 
Don (2007)
Yogi (2007)
Okka Magadu (2008)
Deepavali (2008) 
Aatadista (2008)
Tinnama Padukunnama Tellarinda! (2008)
Kalidasu (2008)
Appuchesi Pappukudu (2008)
Hare Ram (2008)
Baladur (2008)
Chintakayala Ravi (2008)
Kausalya Supraja Rama (2008) 
Ekaloveyudu (2008)
Kuberulu (2008)
Naa Style Veru (2009)
Arundhati (2009)
Fitting Master (2009) 
Adhineta (2009)
Mitrudu (2009)
Kick (2009)
Samrajyam (2009)
Anjaneyulu (2009)
Bendu Apparao R.M.P (2009)
Jayeebhava (2009)
Ek Niranjan (2009)
Kasko (2009)
Pravarakhyudu (2009)
Simha (2010)
Betting Bangaraju (2010)
Sye Aata (2010)
Kathi Kantha Rao (2010)
Nagavalli (2010)
Ranga The Donga (2010)
Broker (2010)
KSD Appalaraju (2011)
Veera (2011)
Maaro (2011)
Money Money, More Money (2011)
Dussasana (2011)
Madatha Kaja (2011)
Chattam (2011)
Kshetram (2011)
Friends Book (2012)
Dhammu (2012)
Nandeeshwarudu (2012)
Uu Kodathara? Ulikki Padathara? (2012)
Sudigadu (2012)
Rebel (2012)
Avunu (2012)
Dhenikaina Ready
Yamudiki Mogudu (2012)
Onamalu (2012)
Sevakudu (2013)
Mahankali (2013)
Jai Sriram (2013)
1000 Abaddalu (2013)
Bhai (2013)
Biskett (2013)
Legend (2014)
Manam (2014)
Manasa Thulli Padake (2014)
Jump Jilani (2014)
Ra Ra... Krishnayya (2014)
Drushyam (2014)
Oka Laila Kosam (2014)
Ee Varsham Sakshiga (2014)
Tungabhadra (2015)
Jil (2015)
Dohchay (2015)
Lion (2015)
Vinavayya Ramayya (2015) 
Tippu (2015) 
Soggade Chinni Nayana (2016)
Sarrainodu (2016)
Parvathipuram (2016)
Mental Police (2016) 
Meelo Evaru Koteeswarudu (2016)
Intlo Deyyam Nakem Bhayam (2016)
Sathamanam Bhavati (2017)
Head Constable Venkatramaiah (2017)
Rarandoi Veduka Chudham (2017) 
Jaya Janaki Nayaka (2017)
Jai Lava Kusa (2017)
Ammammagarillu (2018)
Nannu Dochukunduvate (2018)
Vinaya Vidheya Rama (2019)
Ruler (2019)
Johaar (2020)
Aaradugula Bullet (2021)
Bangarraju (2022)

As producer
As producer the films are:
Kaliyuga Krishnudu
Kadapareddamma
Jagannatakam
Pellante Nurella Panta
Presidentigari Alludu
Ardharatri Hatyalu
Raktham Chindina Raatri

As actor in web series

References

External links

1944 births
2022 deaths
Telugu male actors
Telugu comedians
People from Krishna district
Indian male film actors
Male actors from Andhra Pradesh
Male actors in Telugu cinema
Telugu film producers
Film producers from Andhra Pradesh
20th-century Indian male actors
21st-century Indian male actors